Ann Maree Kerr (21 October 1967) is an Australian rhythmic gymnast.

Kerr competed for Australia in the rhythmic gymnastics individual all-around competition at the 1984 Summer Olympics in Los Angeles. There she was 26th in the preliminary (qualification) round and did not advance to the final.

References

External links 
 Ann Maree Kerr at Sports-Reference.com

1967 births
Living people
Australian rhythmic gymnasts
Gymnasts at the 1984 Summer Olympics
Olympic gymnasts of Australia
20th-century Australian women
21st-century Australian women